In the philosophy of mind, logical behaviorism (also known as analytical behaviorism) is the thesis that mental concepts can be explained in terms of behavioral concepts.

Logical behaviorism was first stated by the Vienna Circle, especially Rudolf Carnap. Other philosophers with sympathies for behaviorism included C. G. Hempel, Ludwig Wittgenstein, and W. V. O. Quine (1960). A more moderate form of analytical behaviorism was put forward by the Oxford philosopher Gilbert Ryle in his book The Concept of Mind (1949).

Etymology 
Logical behaviorism is called "logical", after the idea adopted by Bertrand Russell, that mathematics can be described in terms of formal logic, using Set Theory, and thus make it "scientific", "provable", "specific", consistent and "truthful". In a similar way, it was thought by the Vienna Circle that the phenomena of human mental states such as feelings, perceptions, imaginations etc. can be described in terms of a tendency to behave in a certain way, which could then be tested and explained scientifically through the methods of Behaviorism, whereby everything consists of stimulus-response pairs, with various types of origins and different types of reinforcement.

See also
 Behaviorism
 Methodological behaviorism

References

Behaviorism
Physicalism
Theory of mind